Marcos de Barros Leopoldo Guerra (ca. 1963 – December 23, 2014), a Brazilian blogger for his blog Ubatuba Cobra in Ubatuba, Brazil. Guerra was known for his denunciation of corrupt politicians in Ubatuba and nearby São Paulo. He died after being shot by two men in his home in Ubatuba. Guerra had been receiving death threats in response to the political content of his blog prior to his murder.

Personal
Guerra, 51 years old at the time of his murder, was born around 1963. He resided at Rua Santa Genoveva in the Praia do Tenório (Translated: Tenório Beach) neighborhood of Ubatuba, Brazil. He was single and lived with his 85-year-old father, who discovered his son's dead body. His funeral was on December 24, 2014.

Career
Guerra was a lawyer and journalist known for his blog, Ubatuba Cobra. He used his blog to investigate and criticize the corrupt actions of politicians in his home city of Ubatuba as well as nearby São Paulo. His posts on the misappropriation of funds by local administrators received negative attention which culminated in death threats being sent to Guerra.

Death
According to his father, Guerra received a series of death threats relating to the political content of his blog. Guerra was killed in his home not long after. His neighbors reported that two men shot Guerra from outside of the house, through the window to his kitchen, where he was standing. Guerra suffered three wounds in the head, back, and torso and died where he stood. His father, who had been in another room of the house, heard the shots and the sound of a motorcycle driving away.

Context
One of Guerra's final blog posts indicated that the Munincipal Tourism Council of Ubatuba had not been performing proper bookkeeping.

Impact 
Despite the passing of the "Marco Municipal da Internet" earlier in 2014, which legally guaranteed freedom of expression and consumption for Internet users in Brazil, Guerra was just one of three Brazilian journalists to be killed in retaliation for their work in 2014. Camera-man  Santiago Ildio Andrade and Pedro Palma, owner of the weekly Surroundings Regional newspaper were both murdered in February of that year. Violence against journalists continued in 2015 with the deaths of Gleydson Carvalo, Evany José Metzker, and Djalma Santo da Conceição, who were each also shot and killed in the Brazilian state of Maranhão.

Reactions

See also
Human rights in Brazil
Edinaldo Filgueira
Décio Sá
Evany José Metzker
Orislandio Timóteo Araújo
Ítalo Eduardo Diniz Barros

References 

1963 births
2014 deaths
Assassinated Brazilian journalists
Brazilian bloggers
People from Ubatuba
Deaths by firearm in Brazil
Journalists killed in Brazil